Von Hemmling is the solo project of Jim McIntyre and one of many experimental music projects associated with The Elephant 6 Recording Company. Though Jim McIntyre is the band's primary performer, Hilarie Sidney and John Hill have both been members of Von Hemmling before becoming members of The Apples in Stereo. Other frequent collaborators include Rich Sandoval, Rob Greene, Dane Terry, Mike Snowden, John Ferguson, Trevor Tremaine and Mike Buckley.  Von Hemmling was named by Denver artist Little Fyodor, in a conversation where Don Henley was mistakenly heard as "Von Hemmling"

Discography

References

External links
Official site
Von Hemmling at Elephant6.com
Von Hemmling at MySpace
6 Questions with Jim McIntyre at Optical Atlas

The Elephant 6 Recording Company artists